The Uncanny is a 1977 British-Canadian anthology horror film directed by Denis Héroux, written by Michel Parry, and starring Peter Cushing, Donald Pleasence, Ray Milland, Joan Greenwood, Donald Pilon, Samantha Eggar, and John Vernon.

Although it is similar to the horror anthologies released by Amicus Productions and could be mistaken as one, it was actually distributed by The Rank Organisation. However, the co-producer was Milton Subotsky of Amicus.

Plot

Montreal 1977
In 1977, in Montreal, writer Wilbur Gray visits his publisher Frank Richards to discuss his new book about cats. Wilbur believes that felines are supernatural creatures, and that they are the devil in disguise. Wilbur tells three tales to illustrate his thoughts:

London 1912
In 1912, in London, Miss Malkin is a wealthy woman who rewrites her will leaving her fortune to her cats rather than to her nephew Michael. Her maid Janet, also the mistress of Michael, steals one copy of the will from the lawyer's briefcase and tries to destroy the original copy which is kept in the safe. When Miss Malkin sees her attempt, Janet kills her. The cats avenge Miss Malkin's death.

Quebec 1975
In 1975, in the Province of Quebec, the orphan Lucy comes to live with her aunt Mrs. Blake, her husband, and her cousin Angela after the death of her parents in a plane crash. Lucy brings her only friend, the cat Wellington, but her mean cousin forces her parents to get rid of Wellington. Lucy uses her mother's book of witchcraft to avenge Wellington.

Hollywood 1936
In 1936, in Hollywood, the actor Valentine De'ath replaces the blade of a fake pendulum to kill his actress wife, and give his young mistress and aspiring actress Edina a chance. The cat of his wife avenges her death.

Cast

Montreal 1977 

Peter Cushing as Wilbur Gray
Ray Milland as Frank Richards

London 1912 

Susan Penhaligon as Janet
Joan Greenwood as Miss Malkin
Roland Culver as Wallace
Simon Williams as Michael

Quebec 1975 

Donald Pilon as Mr. Blake
Alexandra Stewart as Mrs. Joan Blake
Chloe Franks as Angela Blake
Katrina Holden Bronson as Lucy
 Renée Girard as Mrs. Maitland

Hollywood 1936 

Samantha Eggar as Edina Hamilton
Donald Pleasence as Valentine De'ath
John Vernon as Pomeroy
Catherine Bégin as Madeleine
Jean LeClerc as Barrington
Sean McCann as The Inspector

Production
"The Uncanny" is the fifth Milton Subotsky film in which a character has the name "Maitland" ("Mrs. Maitland" played by Renee Girard). The others are And Now the Screaming Starts! (1973) in which Guy Rolfe plays "Maitland;" Tales from the Crypt (1972) in which Ian Hendry plays "Carl Maitland;" The Skull (1965) which top-bills Peter Cushing as "Dr. Christopher Maitland;" and the earliest, The City of the Dead (aka Horror Hotel, 1960) in which Tom Naylor plays "Bill Maitland."

Filming
The film was a British-Canadian co-production shot on-location in Montreal and Senneville, Quebec, and Pinewood Studios in England.

Filming started in Montreal on 16 November 1976.

Release

Certification
In the UK, the film was originally given an X-rating.

Reception

Box Office
The film performed poorly at the box office.

References

External links

 
 
 The Uncanny review - Family Friendly Movies

1977 films
1977 horror films
British supernatural horror films
Films about cats
Films set in 1912
Films set in 1936
Films set in 1975
Films set in London
Films set in Los Angeles
Films set in Quebec
Films shot at Pinewood Studios
British horror anthology films
Films about size change
Films about writers
Films about witchcraft
English-language Canadian films
Canadian supernatural horror films
Films directed by Denis Héroux
1970s English-language films
1970s Canadian films
1970s British films